is a 2005 yaoi manga written and illustrated by Kae Maruya. It is licensed in English by Digital Manga Publishing, which released the manga on 21 October 2008.  It is licensed in German by Carlsen Comics, under the title Love Contract.

Reception
Leroy Douresseaux describes the manga as "passionately romantic", and praised the author's characterisation and artwork. Patricia Beard felt that experienced readers would find some stories familiar. Holly Ellingwood described it as "the perfect yaoi for fans of happy endings".

References

2005 manga
Digital Manga Publishing titles
Tokuma Shoten manga
Yaoi anime and manga